In Greek mythology, the Meleagrids were Calydonian princesses as the daughters of Queen Althaea and King Oeneus, and sisters of the hero Meleager.

Mythology 
When their brother died, the Meleagrides cried incessantly until Artemis changed them into guineafowl and transferred them to the island of Leros. According to an alternate version cited in the dictionary of Suda, the Meleagrids were companions of Iocallis, a maiden of Leros who was honored as a deity. Guinea fowl were kept in the shrine of The Maiden (likely Artemis) on Leros, and the inhabitants of the island, as well as other worshippers of Artemis, abstained from eating the bird.

Hence the names of some species of guineafowl refer to the Meleagrids: Numida meleagris and Agelastes meleagrides. Also the family name for turkeys is Meleagrididae.

The Meleagrids included Melanippe and Eurymede, possibly also Mothone, Perimede and Polyxo. Two other daughters of Oeneus, Gorge and Deianeira, were not transformed, since the former was married off to Andraemon, and the latter to Heracles.

Notes

References 

 Claudius Aelianus, On the Characteristics of Animals, translated by Alwyn Faber Scholfield (1884-1969), from Aelian, Characteristics of Animals, published in three volumes by Harvard/Heinemann, Loeb Classical Library, 1958. Online version at the Topos Text Project.
 Claudius Aelianus, De Natura Animalium, Latin translation by Friedrich Jacobs in the Frommann edition, Jena, 1832. Latin translation available at Bill Thayer's Web Site
 Claudius Aelianus, De Natura Animalium, Rudolf Hercher. Lipsiae, in aedibus B. G. Teubneri, 1864.  Greek text available at the Perseus Digital Library.
 Antoninus Liberalis, The Metamorphoses of Antoninus Liberalis translated by Francis Celoria (Routledge 1992). Online version at the Topos Text Project.
 Athenaeus of Naucratis, The Deipnosophists or Banquet of the Learned. London. Henry G. Bohn, York Street, Covent Garden. 1854. Online version at the Perseus Digital Library.
 Athenaeus of Naucratis, Deipnosophistae. Kaibel. In Aedibus B.G. Teubneri. Lipsiae. 1887. Greek text available at the Perseus Digital Library.
 Gaius Julius Hyginus, Fabulae from The Myths of Hyginus translated and edited by Mary Grant. University of Kansas Publications in Humanistic Studies. Online version at the Topos Text Project.
 Pausanias, Description of Greece with an English Translation by W.H.S. Jones, Litt.D., and H.A. Ormerod, M.A., in 4 Volumes. Cambridge, MA, Harvard University Press; London, William Heinemann Ltd. 1918. . Online version at the Perseus Digital Library
 Pausanias, Graeciae Descriptio. 3 vols. Leipzig, Teubner. 1903.  Greek text available at the Perseus Digital Library.
 Publius Ovidius Naso, Metamorphoses translated by Brookes More (1859-1942). Boston, Cornhill Publishing Co. 1922. Online version at the Perseus Digital Library.
 Publius Ovidius Naso, Metamorphoses. Hugo Magnus. Gotha (Germany). Friedr. Andr. Perthes. 1892. Latin text available at the Perseus Digital Library.
 Suida, Suda Encyclopedia translated by Ross Scaife, David Whitehead, William Hutton, Catharine Roth, Jennifer Benedict, Gregory Hays, Malcolm Heath Sean M. Redmond, Nicholas Fincher, Patrick Rourke, Elizabeth Vandiver, Raphael Finkel, Frederick Williams, Carl Widstrand, Robert Dyer, Joseph L. Rife, Oliver Phillips and many others. Online version at the Topos Text Project.

Princesses in Greek mythology
Metamorphoses into birds in Greek mythology
Aetolian characters in Greek mythology
Deeds of Apollo